The Gaziantep Museum of Archaeology is an archaeological museum located in the city of Gaziantep, Turkey. It housed for some years a collection of mosaics, most of which were excavated from the ancient Roman city site of Zeugma. A new museum, the Zeugma Mosaic Museum now houses those. After an overhaul of the displays the museum now houses a fine collection of finds from the region. Exhibits include a collection of paleolithic artifacts; items from a Bronze Age necropolis; Hittite, Persian, Roman, Hellenistic, and Commagene artworks and glassware; Ottoman and Islamic coins and medallions; and the skeleton of a mammoth.  Attached to the museum is a garden containing a selection of stone artifacts, including pagan tombstones from Zeugma, Christian tombstones, and Hittite statuary.

The museum in its current form dates from 2005, when it was substantially enlarged to house the newly discovered Zeugma mosaics.

See also 
 Zeugma Mosaic Museum
 Yesemek Quarry and Sculpture Workshop

References
 Pictures of the 2020 and some from older situation
 Archaeology Museum   at Gaziantep Museums
 Museum Photos

Archaeological museums in Turkey
Museums in Gaziantep
Museums established in 2005
Visitor attractions in Gaziantep